Ottaviani is an Italian surname. Notable people with the surname include:

Alfonso Ottaviani (born 1937), Italian modern pentathlete
Alfredo Ottaviani (1890–1979), Italian Roman Catholic cardinal
Flavia Ottaviani (born 1981), Italian ice dancer
Giuseppe Ottaviani (athlete) (1916–2020), Italian centenarian and masters athlete
Giuseppe Ottaviani (born 1978), Italian trance musician
Jim Ottaviani, American writer
Luciana Ottaviani (born 1967), real name of Italian actress Jessica Moore
Nicola Ottaviani (born 1968), Italian politician and lawyer

See also
Ottaviani Intervention or Short Critical Study on the New Order of Mass

Italian-language surnames